444 is a year.

444 or variants may also refer to:

 444 BC
 444 (number)

Transport
 British Rail Class 444, a British EMU train
 4-4-4, a Whyte notation classification of steam locomotive
Interstate 444, unsigned route in Oklahoma

Film and television
 4:44 Last Day on Earth, a 2011 American film
 The Haunted House: Room 444, a 2014 pilot Tooniverse animated television series

Music
 444 (album), 2000 album by Charlie Major
 4:44 (album), 2017 album by Jay-Z
 "444", a song from electronic music group Autechre's debut album Incunabula
 "4 4 4", a song from ambient techno group The Fireman's debut album, Strawberries Oceans Ships Forest
 "444" is a song from the album 200 Tons Of Bad Luck by Crippled Black Phoenix

Other uses
.444 Marlin, rifle caliber
4:4:4 is chroma subsampling's "highest" quality level in digital video recording/encoding.